Genevra Reed Counihan (born December 15, 1925) is an American lawyer and Democratic politician from Concord, Massachusetts. She represented the Fortieth Middlesex district in the Massachusetts House of Representatives from 1975 to 1978.  Counihan served on the urban affairs and public service committees. She lost a bid to reelection to John H. Loring.

After leaving the Great and General Court, she was a member of the board of the Metropolitan Area Planning Council.

See also
 1975-1976 Massachusetts legislature
 1977-1978 Massachusetts legislature

References

1925 births
Living people
20th-century American women lawyers
20th-century American lawyers
20th-century American women politicians
20th-century American politicians
Massachusetts lawyers
Members of the Massachusetts House of Representatives
People from Concord, Massachusetts
People from Wichita, Kansas
Women state legislators in Massachusetts